William Bowes may refer to:
Sir William Bowes (MP for County Durham) (1657–1707), English landowner and MP
William Bowes (15th century MP) (died 1439), MP for City of York
Sir William Bowes (soldier) (1389–1460), English military commander
Sir William Bowes (ambassador) (died 1611), English ambassador to Scotland
Bill Bowes (1908–1987), English cricketer
Billy Bowes, Scottish footballer